Mario Agosti (21 July 1904 - June 1992) was an Italian javelin thrower, speciality in which he was 7th at the 1934 European Athletics Championships.

Four-time national champion at senior level.

Biography
Agosti was also a football player. After completing his competitive career in 1937 he was first FIDAL coach, then sports manager and first President of the CONI Provincial Committee of Pordenone, the city where he died in June 1992.

National records
 Javelin throw: 65.23 m ( Udine, 3 November 1935) - record holder until 16 September 1950.

Achievements

See also
 Men's javelin throw Italian record progression
 Italy at the 1934 European Athletics Championships

References

External links
 Mario Agosti at FIDAL

1904 births
1992 deaths
Italian male javelin throwers
Italian decathletes
Sportspeople from Udine
Italian footballers
Association footballers not categorized by position